Liisa Oviir (born 1 March 1977) is an Estonian lawyer and politician who was Estonia's Minister of Entrepreneurship from 2015 to 2016. Oviir has graduated from the Faculty of Law of the University of Tartu in 2000.

Early life
Liisa Oviir is the mother of two sons. She has been divorced from her husband since 2010. Her father is a lawyer and civil servant Mihkel Oviir and her mother is politician Siiri Oviir. Her father's grandfather was pastor Madis Oviir.

Career
From 1997–1998, Liisa Oviir served as a referent in the Estonian Embassy in London. She worked as a lawyer in Tallink from 1998–2008 and Eesti Energia from 2008–2015.

On 14 September 2015, Oviir became the Minister of Entrepreneurship in Taavi Rõivas' second cabinet. She is a member of the Social Democratic Party.

References

External links
Liisa Oviir at the Government of Estonia official website

1977 births
Government ministers of Estonia
Living people
Social Democratic Party (Estonia) politicians
Women government ministers of Estonia
Politicians from Tallinn
University of Tartu alumni
21st-century Estonian politicians
Members of the Riigikogu, 2015–2019
21st-century Estonian women politicians